Wilson Run may refer to:

 Wilson Run (Brandywine Creek tributary), a stream in Delaware
Wilson Run (Missouri), a stream in Missouri
Wilson Run (Little Muskingum River tributary), a stream in Ohio
Wilson Run (Kipps Run tributary), a stream in Pennsylvania
Wilson Run (Sewickley Creek tributary), a stream in Westmoreland County, Pennsylvania

Other:
Wilson Run: a cross country race run at Sedbergh School